() is a term in the Vedic practice that refers to an offering made to divine entities. It refers to the act of offering as well as the substance used in the offering. Tilatarpana is a specific form of tarpana involving libations offered to the pitri (deceased ancestors) using water and sesame seeds during Pitru Paksha or as a death rite.

Tarpana is a form of arghya (an offering). It is offered to all devas as well as the Navagrahas whenever mulamantra is recited as japa.

Instances of welcome tarpana 

 For devis:
 for Lakshmi, “”  (Śrī Sūkta 4), "One who is satisfied and who satisfies those who offer Her Tarpana"
 for Tripura Sundari, “”  (Lalita Sahasranama 178, 974), "One who is satisfied by just a single drop of Tarpana"
 Cow's milk (raw, unheated, and unpasteurized), water, sugar, saffron, cardamom, borneo-camphor, etc. are mixed and used as the offering.
 One tarpana (or arghya) is offered for the recitation of every ten mulamantras and one for part thereof.

Tilatarpana 
Tilatarpana is the tarpana (or arghya) offered to pitris (departed ancestors) by male descendants who do not have a living father. This is offered at the first annual shraddha (death anniversary) and during subsequent annual shraddhas, amavasyas (new moon days), sankramanas (solar ingresses), eclipses, and during visits to selected holy places of pilgrimage.

Offering tilatarpana 

 Black tila seeds (gingelly seeds which are black and white which is eaten with jaggery on makar sankrati usually on January 14/15 in north India, but only black gingelly is used in tarpana, used along with water as the offering.
 A pavitra (ring) made of kush grass should be worn on the ring finger of the right hand and kush grasses in left fingers horizontally called tekusha.

Posture of hand 
The hand while offering tarpana varies for offerings made to devas (Gods, Goddesses and Navagrahas), rishis (sages) and pitrus (departed ancestors). 
(a) For devas, the offering is made to flow over the eight fingers of both hands adjoined together other than the thumb known as dev tirtha
(b) For rishis, the offering is made to flow between both palms adjoined tarpan dripping between both palms known as rishi tirtha
(c) For pitris, the offering is made to flow over the left side of the left palm and the thumb of the left hand.known as pitra tirtha.the janew or yajnopavita resting on right shoulder falling to left side on the hip. This is known as upsavya.as the yajnopavita is resting on the left side so the pitra tarpanj should be offered with the left hand. This is the reason to circumambulate the deceased anti-clockwise. The left hand should be used for pind danam. In all other rituals apart from pitras shradha, the use of the right hand is compulsory.

Gingelly 
Gingelly is not to be confused with sesame, which is from a large tree; gingelly is a small seed that stores energy and hence is considered a favorite of all Devas, Shani (Saturn) and pitrus. Lord Ganesha is commonly offered pancha-kajjaya, a delicacy made using sesame. Lord Shiva is worshipped with sesame seeds (tilakshata). For Lord Vishnu, Lord Brahma, Goddess Laxmi and Goddess Saraswati, gingelly seeds are used in their favorite eatables. It is used as a homa dravya (an ingredient in the fire offerings) in many havans and homas. Therefore, tila (gingelly) and tilatarpana should not be dismissed as inauspicious.

Reasons for offering tarpana 
It is believed that one's pitris eagerly await tarpana. If no offering is made, they return to their places disappointed, and the descendant misses their blessings that he would have received, if he had performed his filial duties. Kosha Kushi  is an important ritual item used in the Tantric worship of the Divine Mother and represents the yoni and womb of the Goddess, as well as the astral body within the physical body and the microcosm within the macrocosm.

References

Bibliography 

 Tarpana Vidhi Vidhana, authored by Sri Gunjur Ramachandra Sastry, published by Srinidhi Prakashana, Bangalore 560053 INDIA
 The Sacred Books of the Hindus, Chapter 4, pg 21

External links 
 Sanskrit 
 Detailed Tarpana Vidhi (Tharpana/Tarpan Vidhi) Procedure in Sanskrit and various other Indian languages
 Iyer mantras
 Bodhayana tarpanam mantras
 Yajurveda apastambha sutra tarpanam

Rituals in Hindu worship
Hindu practices
Hindu rituals related to death
Water and Hinduism